Asperula purpurea is a species of flowering plant in the family Rubiaceae. It was first described in 1974  and is endemic to France, Switzerland, Italy, Austria, Slovenia, Serbia, Bosnia and Herzegovina, Montenegro, Croatia, Romania, Albania, Greece, and Turkey.

References

External links 
 Asperula purpurea (L.) Ehrend. - The Plant List

purpurea
Flora of France
Flora of Switzerland
Flora of Italy
Flora of Austria
Flora of Slovenia
Flora of Serbia
Flora of Bosnia and Herzegovina
Flora of Montenegro
Flora of Croatia
Flora of Romania
Flora of Albania
Flora of Greece
Flora of Turkey